Microdosing, or micro-dosing, is a technique for studying the behaviour of drugs in humans through the administration of doses so low ("sub-therapeutic") they are unlikely to produce whole-body effects, but high enough to allow the cellular response to be studied. This is called a "Phase 0 study" and is usually conducted before clinical Phase I to predict whether a drug is viable for the next phase of testing. Human microdosing aims to reduce the resources spent on non-viable drugs and the amount of testing done on animals. 

Less commonly, the term "microdosing" is also sometimes used to refer to precise dispensing of small amounts of a drug substance (e.g., a powder API) for a drug product (e.g., a capsule) and, when the drug substance also happens to be liquid, this can potentially overlap what is termed microdispensing. For example, cannabis microdosing and psychedelic microdosing.

Techniques 
The basic approach is to label a candidate drug using the radio isotope carbon-14, then administer the compound to human volunteers at levels typically about 100 times lower than the proposed therapeutic dosage (from around 1 to 100 micrograms but not above). 

As only microdose levels of the drug are used, analytical methods are limited. Extreme sensitivity is needed. Accelerator Mass Spectrometry is the most common method for microdose analysis. AMS was developed in the late 1970s from two distinct research threads with a common goal: an improvement in radiocarbon dating that would make efficient use of datable material and that would extend the routine and maximum reach of radiocarbon dating.  AMS is routinely used in geochronology and archaeology, but biological applications began appearing in 1990 mainly due to the work of scientists at Lawrence Livermore National Laboratory. AMS service is now more accessible for biochemical quantitation from several private companies and non-commercial access to AMS is available at the National Institutes of Health (NIH) Research Resource at Lawrence Livermore National Laboratory, or through the development of smaller affordable spectrometers. AMS does not measure the radioactivity of carbon-14 in microdose samples. AMS, like other mass spectrometry methods, measures ionic species according to mass-to-charge ratio.

Psychedelic 

Psychedelic microdosing is the practice of using sub-threshold doses (microdoses) of serotonergic psychedelic drugs in an attempt to improve creativity, boost physical energy level, emotional balance, increase performance on problems-solving tasks and to treat anxiety, depression and addiction, though there is very little evidence supporting these purported effects as of 2019. In this context, microdosing is considered an application of hormesis.

Impact of use 
It is reported that 15 of the 20 largest pharmaceutical companies have now used microdosing in drug development, and the use of the technique has been provisionally endorsed by both the European Medicines Agency and the Food and Drug Administration. It was once expected that by 2010, human microdosing would have gained a secure foothold at the discovery-preclinical interface, driven by early measurement of candidate drug behavior in humans and by irrefutable economic arguments.

In January 2006, the European Union Microdose AMS Partnership Programme (EUMAPP) was launched. Ten organizations from five different countries (United Kingdom, Sweden, Netherlands, France, and Poland) will study various approaches to the basic AMS technique. The study is set to be published in 2009.

One of the most meaningful potential outcomes of Phase-0/Microdosing studies is the early termination of development. In 2017, Okour et al published the first example in literature of a termination of an oral drug based on IV microdose data. This study provides an example of the application of microdosing in circumstances where pre-clinical data were not sufficient to provide accurate information to guide first-in-human (FIH) study design.

See also
Pharmacology

References 

 "The use of accelerator mass spectrometry to obtain early human ADME/PK data" G Lappin & R C Garner Expert Opinion in Pug Metabolite and Toxic (2005) 1(1):23-31
 "Improved early clinical development through human microdosing studies" I Wilding & J Bell Drug Discovery Today 2005 July 1;10(13):890-4
 "New ultrasensitive detection technologies and techniques for use in microdosing studies" G Lappin, C Wagner, O Langer & N van de Merbel Bioanalysis 2009 May 1(2):357–366

External links
 Review article on microdosing as a means of reducing the use of animals in drug testing (PDF format)
 EU announcement of EUMAPP project

Pharmacokinetics
Clinical research
Alternatives to animal testing